Iwan is a rectangular hall or space, commonly associated with Islamic architecture. 

Iwan may also refer to:

 Iwan (name), a male given name and a surname
 Iwan (musician) (born 1985), Ghanaian reggae and dance hall performer
 Iwan (singer) (born 1980), Lebanese singer
 3634 Iwan, a main-belt asteroid

See also
 
 Ivan (disambiguation)
 Iwana (disambiguation)
 Eyvan, a city in Iran